Tom Tvedt (born 31 January 1968) is a Norwegian politician for the Labour Party.

He became county mayor of Rogaland following the 2007 Norwegian local elections. Before this he was the mayor of Randaberg for eight years. He also served as a deputy representative to the Parliament of Norway from Rogaland during the term 2005–2009.

In 2011 he was voted board member of the Norwegian Confederation of Sports, and in 2015 he was voted president.

References

1968 births
Living people
People from Randaberg
Labour Party (Norway) politicians
Deputy members of the Storting
Mayors of places in Rogaland
Chairmen of County Councils of Norway
Norwegian sports executives and administrators
Norwegian sportsperson-politicians